The Jolly Fisherman is a poster created by artist John Hassall in 1908 after he had been commissioned by the Great Northern Railway (GNR). It is regarded as one of the most famous holiday advertisements of all time and is believed to have influenced the success of Skegness, Lincolnshire as a holiday destination. Hassall was paid 12 Guineas for his work, and the original painting hangs in the town hall at Skegness.

The poster depicts a fisherman skipping along the beach, with the slogan "Skegness is SO bracing". There are different versions of the poster, however, the fisherman and the slogan are always part of the design; one such later design, promoted by the LNER, showed the same fishermen design being tugged along the beach by a toddler hanging onto his scarf. John Hassall visited Skegness in 1936, and was quoted as saying "[that Skegness] was even more bracing and attractive than I had been led to expect."

He is now the mascot for Skegness and celebrated his 100th birthday in 2008, and author, Bill Bryson, put the image on the front cover of his 2015 book, The Road to Little Dribbling. However, the publishers assumed that the image was in the public domain, and so did not obtain permission from the copyright holders, Skegness Town Council. In 2015, the campaign group PETA (People for the Ethical Treatment of Animals), wrote to the town council suggesting that the image of the fisherman be dropped in favour of one showing a flatfish, with the tagline of "A happy plaice". PETA said that the mascot "evokes images of cruelty to animals".

"The Jolly Fisherman" is also the name of places located in Lincolnshire, such as a restaurant, a resort, among others.

Notes

References

External links
 Information from the website of Skegness

Great Northern Railway (Great Britain)
1908 works
Skegness
Posters